In group theory, a branch of mathematics, given a group G under a binary operation ∗, a subset H of G is called a subgroup of G if H also forms a group under the operation ∗.

The trivial subgroup of any group is the subgroup {e} consisting of just the identity element.

A proper subgroup of a group G is a subgroup H which is a proper subset of G (that is). Some authors also exclude the trivial group from being proper (that is, }).

If H is a subgroup of G, then G is sometimes called an overgroup of H.

The same definitions apply more generally when G is an arbitrary semigroup, but this article will only deal with subgroups of groups.

Subgroup tests

Suppose that G is a group, and H is a subset of G.  For now, assume that the group operation of G is written multiplicatively, denoted by juxtaposition.
Then H is a subgroup of G if and only if H is nonempty and closed under products and inverses. Closed under products means that for every a and b in H, the product ab is in H.  Closed under inverses means that for every a in H, the inverse a−1 is in H. These two conditions can be combined into one, that for every a and b in H, the element ab−1 is in H, but it is more natural and usually just as easy to test the two closure conditions separately.
When H is finite, the test can be simplified: H is a subgroup if and only if it is nonempty and closed under products. These conditions alone imply that every element a of H generates a finite cyclic subgroup of H, say of order n, and then the inverse of a is an−1.
If the group operation is instead denoted by addition, then closed under products should be replaced by closed under addition, which is the condition that for every a and b in H, the sum a+b is in H, and closed under inverses should be edited to say that for every a in H, the inverse −a is in H.

Basic properties of subgroups

The identity of a subgroup is the identity of the group: if G is a group with identity eG, and H is a subgroup of G with identity eH, then eH = eG.
The inverse of an element in a subgroup is the inverse of the element in the group: if H is a subgroup of a group G, and a and b are elements of H such that ab = ba = eH, then ab = ba = eG.
If H is a subgroup of G, then the inclusion map H → G sending each element a of H to itself is a homomorphism.
The intersection of subgroups A and B of G is again a subgroup of G. For example, the intersection of the x-axis and y-axis in R under addition is the trivial subgroup.  More generally, the intersection of an arbitrary collection of subgroups of G is a subgroup of G.
The union of subgroups A and B is a subgroup if and only if A ⊆ B or B ⊆ A.  A non-example: 2Z ∪ 3Z is not a subgroup of Z, because 2 and 3 are elements of this subset whose sum, 5, is not in the subset.   Similarly, the union of the x-axis and the y-axis in R is not a subgroup of R.
Every element a of a group G generates a cyclic subgroup . If  is isomorphic to Z/nZ (the integers mod n) for some positive integer n, then n is the smallest positive integer for which an = e, and n is called the order of a. If  is isomorphic to Z, then a is said to have infinite order.
The subgroups of any given group form a complete lattice under inclusion, called the lattice of subgroups. (While the infimum here is the usual set-theoretic intersection, the supremum of a set of subgroups is the subgroup generated by the set-theoretic union of the subgroups, not the set-theoretic union itself.) If e is the identity of G, then the trivial group {e} is the minimum subgroup of G, while the maximum subgroup is the group G itself.

Cosets and Lagrange's theorem

Given a subgroup H and some a in G, we define the left coset aH = {ah : h in H}. Because a is invertible, the map φ : H → aH  given by φ(h) = ah is a bijection.

Lagrange's theorem states that for a finite group G and a subgroup H, 
 
where |G| and  |H| denote the orders of G and H, respectively. In particular, the order of every subgroup of G (and the order of every element of G) must be a divisor of  |G|.

Right cosets are defined analogously: Ha = {ha : h in H}.

If aH = Ha for every a in G, then H is said to be a normal subgroup. Every subgroup of index 2 is normal: the left cosets, and also the right cosets, are simply the subgroup and its complement. More generally, if p is the lowest prime dividing the order of a finite group G, then any subgroup of index p (if such exists) is normal.

Example: Subgroups of Z8
Let G be the cyclic group Z8 whose elements are

and whose group operation is addition modulo 8. Its Cayley table is

In general, subgroups of cyclic groups are also cyclic.

Example: Subgroups of S4
Let S4 be the symmetric group on 4 elements.
Below are all the subgroups of S4, listed according to the number of elements, in decreasing order.

24 elements
The whole group S4 is a subgroup of S4, of order 24.  Its Cayley table is

12 elements

8 elements

6 elements

4 elements

3 elements

2 elements
Each element  of order 2 in S4 generates a subgroup } of order 2.
There are 9 such elements: the  transpositions (2-cycles) and the three elements (12)(34), (13)(24), (14)(23).

1 element
The trivial subgroup is the unique subgroup of order 1 in S4.

Other examples
The even integers form a subgroup 2Z of the integer ring Z: the sum of two even integers is even, and the negative of an even integer is even.
A linear subspace of a vector space is a subgroup of the additive group of vectors.
In an abelian group, the elements of finite order form a subgroup called the torsion subgroup.

See also 
 Cartan subgroup
 Fitting subgroup
 Fixed-point subgroup
 Fully normalized subgroup
 Stable subgroup

Notes

References 
 .
 .
 .
 
 
 
 

Group theory
Subgroup properties